Stop Flirting is a 1925 American silent comedy film directed by Scott Sidney and starring Wanda Hawley, John T. Murray and Ethel Shannon. It is based on the 1923 play of the same title by  Frederick J. Jackson.

Synopsis
On their honeymoon Vivian Reynolds finds her husband Perry in the company of other woman twice. To teach him a lesson she begins flirting with every man she encounters. To pay her back Perry then stages his death in a flying accident. When she discovers the truth she is even more enraged. After a further series of misadventures the couple eventually reconcile.

Cast
 Wanda Hawley as Vivian Marsden Reynolds - The Bride
 John T. Murray as Perry Reynolds - The Groom
 Hallam Cooley as Jeffrey Newfield
 Ethel Shannon as Marjorie Leeds
 Jimmie Adams as Baron Foucould
 Vera Steadman as Suzanne
 Jack Duffy as Joseph - the Butler
 James Harrison as Teddy 
 David James as Bobby Anderson
 Rolfe Sedan as One of Vivian's Admirers

References

Bibliography
 Connelly, Robert B. The Silents: Silent Feature Films, 1910-36, Volume 40, Issue 2. December Press, 1998.
 Munden, Kenneth White. The American Film Institute Catalog of Motion Pictures Produced in the United States, Part 1. University of California Press, 1997.

External links
 

1925 films
1925 comedy films
1920s English-language films
American silent feature films
Silent American comedy films
Films directed by Scott Sidney
American black-and-white films
Producers Distributing Corporation films
1920s American films